Ellen Lucille "Evelyn" Thomas (born August 22, 1953) is an American singer from Chicago, Illinois, best known for the Hi-NRG dance hits "High Energy", "Masquerade", "Standing at the Crossroads", "Reflections", and "Weak Spot".

Thomas has an entertainment incorporated company, called Eljopan Entertainment Incorporated.

Career
Although best known worldwide for her 1980s Hi-NRG, techno club hits, Thomas recorded and performed disco, Eurobeat, R&B, and dance music songs in the 1980s. She was discovered by British producer Ian Levine, who was in the US in 1975 scouting for gospel and soul singers he could promote in the UK. The two recorded several tracks which resulted in a contract with 20th Century Records. 

Thomas scored a chart hit with her first single, reaching the UK top 30 in 1976 with the single "Weak Spot," co-written by Levine and Paul David Wilson. A follow-up single, "Doomsday", entered the UK charts twice, and Levine and Thomas would continue their association for quite some time. She signed to US label Casablanca Records for her first album release I Wanna Make It on My Own, released 1978. With Casablanca doing little to promote the LP, she switched to AVI Records for the double A-side 12-inch single "Have a Little Faith in Me" / "No Time to Turn Around" which prompted the label to release it as an LP, backed with Rick Gianatos' extended remixes of her 1976 tracks "My Head's in the Stars" and "Love's Not Just an Illusion".

By 1984, Levine had re-established himself as a producer and asked Thomas to come to London to record a new track "High Energy". Just few weeks after it was released, it was a chart hit in Europe - peaking at No. 1 in Germany and peaked at No. 5 in the UK. The song was her only Billboard Hot 100 entry, peaking at No. 85, although three additional songs hit the Billboard dance chart.

The follow-up single, "Masquerade", was taken from her third album High Energy, released the same year. While it received heavy rotation in European clubs, it failed to break into the UK top 40. Later in the year, "Heartless" became her only single other than "High Energy" to chart outside of the dance charts in the United States. "Heartless" peaked at No. 84 on the Black Singles chart (later renamed the Hot R&B/Hip-Hop Singles & Tracks chart) in 1985.

Though she would not return to the US pop or R&B charts, she had a dance chart hit with a cover of The Supremes' 1967 song "Reflections", peaking at No. 18 on the Hot Dance Music/Club Play chart in early 1986. A second Thomas release that summer fared even better on the dance charts, with "How Many Hearts" narrowly missing the top 10, peaking at No. 11. The two songs would later appear on Thomas' fourth album release, Standing at the Crossroads, in 1986.

Discography

Studio albums
I Wanna Make It on My Own (Casablanca Records, 1978)
Have a Little Faith in Me (AVI Records, 1979)
High Energy (Record Shack, 1984)
Standing at the Crossroads (Record Shack, 1986)

Compilation albums
The Best of Evelyn Thomas (Hot Productions, 1991)
High Energy: The Best of Evelyn Thomas (Hallmark, 2000)

Singles

See also
List of artists who reached number one on the U.S. Dance Club Songs chart
Soul music

References

External links
 Discography at Rate Your Music.
 Evelyn Thomas at Discogs.

1953 births
Living people
Singers from Chicago
American women singers
American disco musicians
American house musicians
American soul singers
American hi-NRG musicians
American women in electronic music
21st-century American women